Brydon may refer to:

Brydon, West Virginia

People with the name Brydon
 Mark Brydon (born 1960), English musician
 Mary Brydon, British nurse
 Paul Brydon (born 1951), New Zealand road and track cyclist
 Rob Brydon (born 1965), Welsh actor and comedian
 William Brydon (1811–1873), assistant surgeon in the British East India Company Army

See also
Bryden, a surname
Brydone, a surname